The 2019 World Junior Table Tennis Championships were held in Korat, Thailand, from 24 November to 1 December 2019.

Medal summary

Events

Medal table

See also
2019 World Table Tennis Championships
2019 ITTF World Tour

References

External links
2019 ITTF World Junior Table Tennis Championships

World Junior Table Tennis Championships
World Junior Table Tennis Championships
World Junior Table Tennis Championships
World Junior Table Tennis Championships
Table tennis competitions in Thailand
International sports competitions hosted by Thailand
World Junior Table Tennis Championships
World Junior Table Tennis Championships